András Gáspár (formerly András Tóth-Gáspár; born 18 August 1970 in Budapest, Hungary) is a Hungarian actor, editor and presenter.

Life 
Gáspár is best known for dubbing Seann William Scott in the American Pie and MouseHunt, and Kung Fu Panda 1-2 voicing Po. 1992–1994 from a member of the National Theatre, then he became a freelancer. He played at the Attila József Theatre. He played as a guest artist for the Hungarian Theatre troupe. He has been working in the media as an editor since 1994. He worked at mSATA, TV3, RTL Klub, and is currently trading televisions and a MTVA employee. Since 2002, he has been part of Foreign Trade faculty at the Budapest College of Economics, the International Communications Department, and correspondence courses for graduate students. In 2005, he graduated in economics. He also graduated from Academy of Drama and Film in Budapest in 1993 carried out. He was also an actor at the Guildhall School in 1991 and later the British American Drama Academy and was a student at their acting department in 1992. His wife is a fellow actor and they have three children (two born in 1991, and one in 1997).

Roles

Films 
 A holnap munkája, presenter
 American Reunion (2012) syncing audio
 Kung Fu Panda 2 (2011), syncing (Po)
 Gulliver's Travels ( 2010), syncing
 Az Alef labirintusa (2008; TV-film)
 Kung Fu Panda (2008), syncing (Po)
 Rendőrsztori (Hungarian-action film series, 2000)
 Európa expressz (Hungarian action film, 1998)
 Kisváros (Hungarian television drama series, 1996) (TV-film)
 Kutyakomédiák (Hungarian comedy series, 1992) (TV-film)
 Itt a szabadság! (Hungarian fictional film, 1990)
 Angyalbőrben (Hungarian television series, 1988)
 The Fairly OddParents (American cartoon series), Cosmo (Nickelodeon)
 Total Drama, syncing (D.J.)
 The Looney Tunes Show, Daffy Duck
 Bananas in Pyjamas, B1

Theatre 
 Andersen (bemutató: 2004. 5 November. Szegedi Nemzeti Színház) actor
 Andersen ( – 2012.) (bemutató: 2004. 3 December. Magyar Színház) actor
 CS.A.J. (CSakAzértisJáték) bemutató: 2009. február 20. Budapesti Kamaraszínház – Ericsson Stúdió) actor
 G.Ö.R.CS. (Görögök Összes Cselekedetei) (bemutató: 2000. 15 October. Centrál Színház) színész, szerző
 Gramp (bemutató: Budapest Bábszínház) rendező, dramaturg
 Isteni Show (bemutató: 2001. 21 October. Centrál Színház) színész, szerző
 Mondod-e még a szót, szeretlek? (bemutató: József Attila Színház) actor
 Rocky Horror Show (bemutató: 2004. 18 April. Musical Színház) actor
 S.Ö.R. (Shakespeare Összes Rövidítve) (bemutató: Centrál Színház) actor, átdolgozta

External links 
 
 
 Színházi Adattár
 Magyar szinkron

1970 births
Living people
Hungarian male stage actors
Hungarian male television actors
Hungarian male voice actors
Male actors from Budapest